The mirrorwing flyingfish (Hirundichthys speculiger) is a flying fish of the family Exocoetidae. It was first described by the French zoologist, Achille Valenciennes in a 22-volume work titled Histoire naturelle des poissons (Natural History of Fishes), which was a collaboration with Georges Cuvier.

Description
Mirrorwing flyingfish have 10-12 soft rays on their dorsal fins and 11-13 rays on their anal fins. Their bodies are generally dark, with blue on top and silver-white on bottom. The dorsal and caudal fins are both grayish, while the other fins are hyaline. Juveniles have more elongated bodies and mottled fins.

Distribution and habitat
Mirrorwing flyingfish are known from warm surface waters worldwide, but are most common in tropical and temperate waters. In the Atlantic Ocean, they are common to the tropical areas in the east and all along the North and South American coasts, but are uncommon in the Gulf of Guinea, Caribbean Sea, and Gulf of Mexico. They are curiously absent from the Benguela Current. In the Indian Ocean, mirrorwing are known from south Africa, Mauritius, Rodrigues, the Maldives, and the Chagos Archipelago. In the Pacific Ocean, they are known from most regions save the seas of southeast Asia. Mirrorwing flyingfish spawn year round in the offshore waters where they normally live attaching their eggs to floating debris in masses. Mirrorwing eggs use a series of filaments to achieve this attachment, the arrangement of which can be used to identify them as mirrorwing eggs.

References

External links
Fishbase
ITIS
EOL
Discoverlife.org
CSIRO publishing

Mirrorwing flying fish
Fish described in 1847